Csenger is a town in Szabolcs-Szatmár-Bereg county, in the Northern Great Plain region of eastern Hungary.

Geography
It lies on left bank of the river Szamos, on the border with Romania.

Twin towns – sister cities

Csenger is twinned with:
 Covasna, Romania
 Hauenstein, Germany
 Negrești-Oaș, Romania
 Tășnad, Romania
 Vetiș, Romania

References

External links 

  in Hungarian

Populated places in Szabolcs-Szatmár-Bereg County